Abū ‘Amr ‘Uthmān ibn ‘Abd il-Raḥmān Ṣalāḥ al-Dīn al-Kurdī al-Shahrazūrī (c. 1181 CE/577 AH – 1245/643), commonly known as Ibn al-Ṣalāḥ, was a Kurdish Shafi'i hadith specialist and the author of the seminal Introduction to the Science of Hadith. He was born in the village of Shahrakhan in Erbil, Kurdistan and was raised in Mosul and then resided in Damascus, where he died.

Early life

Birth
Ibn al-Ṣalāḥ was born in the year 1181 CE/577 AH in Sharazor.

Education
He first studied fiqh with his father in Sharazor, located in the south-eastern part of what is currently referred to as Iraqi Kurdistan. He then occupied himself in Mosul for an unknown period of time, studying under a number of local religious scholars. He studied in a number of cities, including: Baghdad, Hamedan, Naysabur, Merv, Aleppo, Damascus and Harran.

Ibn Khallikan said that he had heard that Ibn al-Ṣalāḥ had repeatedly read al-Muhathab, one of the primary texts of the Shafi'i Madh'hab, "before his mustache had grown." He read Sahih al-Bukhari upon two of his teachers, al-Mayyad ibn Muhammad al-Tusi and Mansur ibn 'Abd al-Mun'im al-Furawi, as well as Al-Sunan al-Kubra, by al-Bayhaqi, upon the latter.

Scholarly career

Scholastic specialization
While Ibn al-Ṣalāḥ was most recognized for his contribution to the field of hadith, he was well-grounded in a variety of disciplines. Ibn Khallikan described him as being from amongst the exemplary scholars of Quranic exegesis, hadith and jurisprudence, participating in a number of religious disciplines and producing sound religious verdicts. Al-Fasi described him as being "a master in both jurisprudence and hadith, and other than that." He was also described by al-Dhahabi as "strong in the Arabic Language" and as "the shaikh of the Shafi'i scholars." Ibn al-Hajib described Ibn al-Salah as being broad in his knowledge of both primary issues (al-usul) and peripheral (al-furu`).

Positions
Ibn al-Ṣalāḥ held several positions throughout his life, primarily in the field of education. He taught at the Salahiyyah School in Jerusalem, and then, following the destruction of its city walls, moved to Damascus and taught at the Rawahiyyah School for some time following its inception. Following the foundation of Dar al-Hadith Ashrafiyyah, he became its shaikh and was the first to teach and give verdicts there in the year 530 AH. It was here that he dictated his work Introduction to the Science of Hadith to his students. He was then appointed a teacher at the al-Shamiyyah al-Sughara School.

Students
Ibn al-Salah had a number of students, some of whom achieved prominence in their own right; from them:

 Ibn Khallikan
 Ibn Razin
 Kamal Ishaq
 Kamal Salar
 Shams al-Din `Abd al-Rahman Nuh al-Maqdisi
 Shihab al-Din Abu Shamah

Theological position
Ibn al-Ṣalāḥ clarified his position on philosophy, describing it as: "The basis of foolishness and degeneration, a topic of confusion and misguidance which is motivated by perversion and blasphemy. Whosoever engages in philosophy, has been blinded in his insight into the great aspects of the Sharia corroborated by evidences." Due to his insistence no one was allowed to read the subjects of rhetoric or philosophy in Damascus, a matter which the leaders supported.

Death
Ibn al-Ṣalāḥ died on Monday, September 18, 1245 CE/643 AH, at the age of 66. His funeral prayer was performed at the congregational mosque of Damascus, to a crowd so large it required a second prayer to accommodate. He was buried in the Sufiyyah graveyard, now the location of a hospital, a mosque and other buildings.

Works
 
Ibn al-Salah had a number of works the most notable named below in addition to others on individual issues.
 Introduction to the Science of Hadith – perhaps his best known work;
 Ishkalat 'ala al-Wasit, also called Mushkil al-Wasit – which comprised brief comments on various subjects primarily in the first fourth of al-Wasit  in Shafi'i fiqh which appeared in a large, single volume
 Al-Amaali – the transcription of the hadith he read aloud to his students, complete with the chains of narration;
  Siyanah Sahih Muslim – an explanation of Sahih Muslim of which only the beginning segment is published which al-Nawawi referred to in his own explanation
 Numerous fatawa, or religious rulings, described by Abu Shahbah as having "much benefit"
 Fawa`id, or benefits, from his travels which consisted of a number of volumes of unusual points of interest in various disciplines which he collected during his travels to Khurasan
 Adab al-Mufti wa al-Mustafti—The Etiquette of the One Giving a Verdict and of the One Seeking a Verdict
 Nukat `Ala al-Muhadhdhab
 Tabaqat al-Fuqaha al-Shafi`iyyah a collection of lesser known Shafi`i scholars of jurisprudence which al-Nawawi abridged and added to. Ibn al-Salah died before completing this work.

See also
 Introduction to the Science of Hadith
 English translation of Introduction to the Science of Hadith

References

Shafi'i fiqh scholars
Asharis
Hadith scholars
Shaykh al-Islāms
Sunni imams
People from Damascus
Biographical evaluation scholars
13th-century jurists
1180s births
1245 deaths
12th-century Kurdish people
13th-century Kurdish people